"Nothing Really Matters" is a song by Dutch DJ and record producer Tiësto and English singer and songwriter Becky Hill. It was released as a single on 17 April 2020 by Musical Freedom as the fifth single from Tiësto's seventh studio album The London Sessions. The song was written by Josh Record, Karen Poole, Kye Gibbon, Matt Robson-Scott, Ollie Green, Rebecca Claire Hill, Ryan Ashley and Tijs Verwest. The song peaked at number 76 on the UK Singles Chart.

Background
In an interview with The Sun's Bizarre column, Hill said, "I wrote four songs for Tiësto during a writing camp last year. I like to have a concept at the start of sessions but we didn't have anything particular in mind. Then we started writing about the world ending. It was all written and done last summer but it feels really fitting with the situation we're in now."

Personnel
Credits adapted from Tidal.
 Kye Gibbon – producer, composer, lyricist
 Matt Robson-Scott – producer, composer, lyricist
 Sergio Popken – producer, additional producer, mixer, studio personnel
 Tijs Verwest – producer, composer, lyricist, associated performer, music production
 Josh Record – composer, lyricist
 Karen Poole – composer, lyricist
 Ollie Green – composer, lyricist
 Rebecca Claire Hill – composer, lyricist, associated performer, vocals
 Ryan Ashley – composer, lyricist, associated performer, vocal producer
 Kevin Grainger – mastering engineer, studio personnel

Charts

Weekly charts

Year-end charts

Release history

References

Tiësto songs
2020 songs
2020 singles
Becky Hill songs
Songs written by Tiësto
Songs written by Becky Hill
Songs written by Kye Gibbon
Songs written by Karen Poole
Songs written by Matt Robson-Scott
Songs written by Josh Record
Songs written by Ollie Green (record producer)